Mr. Murder may refer to:

 "Mr. Murder" (film), a 1969 Hindi suspense thriller
 "Mr. Murder" (novel), a 1993 horror novel by Dean Koontz
 Mr. Murder (miniseries), a 1998 American science fiction-crime thriller television miniseries, based on the novel

See also
 Mr & Mrs Murder, an Australian crime comedy television series